Lingui, The Sacred Bonds is a 2021 internationally co-produced drama film written and directed by Mahamat Saleh Haroun. In June 2021, the film was selected to compete for the Palme d'Or at the 2021 Cannes Film Festival. It was selected as the Chadian entry for the Best International Feature Film at the 94th Academy Awards. It also won IFFI ICFT UNESCO Gandhi Medal at the 52nd International Film Festival of India

Plot
On the outskirts of N'Djamena in Chad, Amina lives alone with her only 15-year-old daughter Maria. Her already fragile world collapses the day she discovers that her daughter is pregnant. The teenager does not want this pregnancy. In a country where abortion is not only condemned by religion, but also by law, Amina finds herself facing a battle that seems lost in advance.

Cast
 Achouackh Abakar Souleymane as Amina
 Rihane Khalil Alio as Maria
 Youssouf Djaoro as Brahim

Release
Following its premiere at the Cannes Film Festival, the film's distribution rights for the US, UK, Turkey, Latin America and Ireland were acquired by MUBI.

See also
 List of submissions to the 94th Academy Awards for Best International Feature Film
 List of Chadian submissions for the Academy Award for Best International Feature Film

References

External links
 

2021 films
2021 drama films
Belgian drama films
Chadian drama films
Films about abortion
Films directed by Mahamat-Saleh Haroun
Films set in Chad
French drama films
2020s French-language films
German drama films
2020s French films